Harbans Singh Wasir, was an Indian cardiologist, medical researcher and writer, and the professor and head of the Department of Cardiology at the All India Institute of Medical Sciences, New Delhi, known for his contributions in the fields of hypertension and rheumatic heart diseases. He was a recipient of Dr. B. C. Roy Award, the highest Indian award in the medical category. The Government of India awarded him the fourth highest civilian honour of Padma Shri in 1987 and followed it up with the third highest honour of Padma Bhushan in 2000.

Biography

Born on 13 August 1937, Wasir graduated in medicine from the All India Institute of Medical Sciences Delhi and continued his studies there to secure MD in medicine in 1965 and DM in cardiology in 1969. His career started at his alma mater itself where he rose in ranks to become the professor and head of the department of cardiology during his thirty years of service there. After superannuation from service in 1997, he joined Batra Hospital, Delhi and served the institution till his death on 23 August 2004.
Wasir served as the honorary physician to four of the Presidents of India and was a Consultant to the World Health Organization on Cardiovascular Diseases. He is credited with research on the topic of preventive cardiology and his research findings have been published by way of several books in English and Hindi, such as Preventive Cardiology, Aging and Heart Care, Heart to Heart — A Holistic Approach to Heart Care, Traditional Wisdom in Heart Care, Life Styles and Longevity and Heart Care for Holistic Health and over 400 medical papers. He also delivered over 350 lectures on cardiology in India and abroad and served as a visiting professor at universities in Sweden, Belgium and Russia. On duty with the World Health Organization, he worked as a consultant at Mauritius, Nepal and Bhutan.

Harbans Singh Wasir was a recipient of Dr. B. C. Roy Award from the Medical Council of India and two civilian awards from the Government of India, the Padma Shri in 1987 and the Padma Bhushan in 2000. He also received the  Research Award from the Indian Council for Medical Research and DSc (honoris causa) in Medical Sciences and was an elected fellow of the National Academy of Sciences, India. He was married to Bhupendra Kaur, a gynecologist and the couple had two sons, Harpreet Wasir (Wife- Dr.Kamal Preet Kaur Wasir) and Jasjeet Wasir( Wife - Dr. Vani Wasir), with 3 grand children namely Amanpreet Wasir, Gitali Wasir and Mehar Wasir . Both the children are medical doctors.

Selected bibliography

References

1937 births
2004 deaths
Recipients of the Padma Bhushan in medicine
Recipients of the Padma Shri in medicine
Dr. B. C. Roy Award winners
All India Institute of Medical Sciences, New Delhi alumni
Indian cardiologists
Indian medical academics
Indian medical researchers
Indian medical writers
Academic staff of the All India Institute of Medical Sciences, New Delhi
World Health Organization officials
Fellows of The National Academy of Sciences, India
20th-century Indian medical doctors
Indian officials of the United Nations